The 1994 Kuril Islands earthquake – also known as the Hokkaido Toho-oki earthquake – occurred on . The epicenter was located at about 70 km east of Shikotan Island. The shaking and tsunami caused road and building damage. At least 10 people were reported dead.

Earthquake
This earthquake was an intra-slab earthquake within the Pacific Plate which is subducting beneath the Okhotsk Plate.

Damage
Oil storage tanks in Malokurilsk and Krabozavodsk were damaged. An oil leak occurred and caused heavy contamination of the port area.

Intensity
The intensity was MSK VI~IX in Shikotan Island.

The earthquake could be felt in Tokyo with shindo 3, and in Hokkaido, the highest intensity reached shindo 6.

Aftershocks
A large aftershock of magnitude  7.1 or  7.7 occurred on October 9, 1994, at 07:55 UTC. It was located at 43.97° N, 148.22° E with a depth of 33 km. It generated a tsunami, and a peak-to-trough tsunami wave height of 18 cm was recorded in Hanasaki, Japan.

Tsunami
A numerical simulation of the tsunami suggested that the first wave was caused by a significant subsidence north of the Kuril Islands due to the earthquake.

This earthquake triggered a tsunami in southern Kuril Islands and Hokkaido. The tsunami run-up height was more than 3 m in Yuzhno-Kurilsk bay and 5 m in Zelenyi Island, Russia.

See also
List of earthquakes in 1994
List of earthquakes in Russia
April 1923 Kamchatka earthquake and tsunami
1963 Kuril Islands earthquake
2006 Kuril Islands earthquake
2007 Kuril Islands earthquake
Kuril–Kamchatka Trench

References

External links

Kuril Islands
1994 earthquakes
1994 tsunamis
Tsunamis in Japan
Tsunamis in Russia
1994 disasters in Russia
Earthquakes in the Russian Far East
Earthquakes in Japan